Krug Park may refer to:

 Krug Park (St. Joseph, Missouri), public park
 Krug Park (amusement park), former amusement park